Really Really Love You: Live at the Dallas Brooks Hall is  the first live album by Australian soul musician, Renée Geyer. This is the second and final album credited to the Renée Geyer Band. The album was recorded in April 1976 as her 'farewell' concert before relocating to the United States.

Track listing 
Vinyl/ cassette (VPL10120G)
Side one
 "Hard Head" (Johnny "Guitar" Watson) – 5.33 
 "Shakey Ground" (Jeffrey Bowen, Edward Hazel, Al Boyd)  – 4.38
 "Person to Person" (Hamish Stuart, Alan Gorrie, Roger Ball, Malcolm Duncan, Robbie Macintosh)  – 4.08
 "It Only Happens"  (with Doug Williams)  (Mickey Denne, Ken Gold) – 4.18
Side Two
 "Booty" (Sylvester Stewart) – 5.06
 "Masquerade" (Herb Magidson, Allie Wrubel) – 6.41 
 "Really, Really... Love You"  (Renée Geyer Band) – 11.08

Charts

Personnel 
Renée Geyer Band
Renée Geyer - vocals, backing vocals
John Pugh - guitars
Mal Logan - keyboards
Barry "Big Goose" Sullivan - bass guitar
Greg Tell - drums

Horn section
Russell Smith - trumpet
Bruce Sandell - saxophones
Miguel Carranza - trombone

References

Renée Geyer albums
1976 live albums
Live albums by Australian artists
Mushroom Records live albums
RCA Records live albums